Rangers Fans Fighting Fund is a fan raised fund which was created to aid the daily running costs of Rangers Football Club.

History
The Fund was launched on 14 March 2012 by Rangers legends Walter Smith and Sandy Jardine during the club's administration in order to raise funds to help protect the Club's future. The Fund was endorsed by three of the largest Rangers fans groups, namely the Rangers Supporters' Trust, the Rangers Supporters Assembly and the Rangers Supporters Association. In September 2014, the Fund decided to withhold any payments to the club after requesting and failing to receive adequate assurances from the then Rangers board regarding its future plans When the Rangers board agreed to grant Mike Ashley's Sport Direct company security over Rangers Training Centre and Ibrox Stadium in January 2015, the Fund pledged £500,000 of its funding to support the Rangers Supporters' Trust's legal battle seeking to prevent the board from doing so.

In February 2016, the Fund revealed plans to provide £450,000 to build a 264-seater stand at the Rangers Training Centre. The stand was constructed in 2019.

Governance
The Fund is overseen by a committee of ten individuals, led by a Chairman.

References

External links
Rangers Fans Fighting Fund

Organizations established in 2012
2012 establishments in Scotland
Rangers F.C.
2012 establishments in the United Kingdom